Georg Hackl (often named: Hackl Schorsch, ; born 9 September 1966) is a German former luger who was three time Olympic and World Champion. He is known affectionately as Hackl-Schorsch or as the Speeding Weißwurst a reference to what he looks like in his white bodysuit coming down the luge at fast speeds.

Biography
Hackl was born in Berchtesgaden, Bavaria. He took up luge as part of his physical education lessons whilst at school, learning to slide at the Königssee track.

Hackl was known for his rivalry with Markus Prock, with Prock being dominant in World Cup competition whilst Hackl consistently achieved success at the Winter Olympics. Although Hackl was not as natural an athlete as Prock, he was noted as being extremely skilled at setting up his sled to suit particular ice conditions on a given day. In addition his coach and former luger Thomas Schwab highlighted Hackl's mental strength as being key to his success.

He won his first Winter Olympic Games luge medal in 1988 in Calgary, when he finished second in the singles event, while placing fourth in the doubles. Four years later, he improved his performance to win the gold, a feat he repeated in 1994 and 1998. In 1998, he won the gold by clocking the fastest time in all four runs, the first in Olympic history in the men's singles to do so (Vera Zozula of the Soviet Union did that feat in the women's singles event at the 1980 Winter Olympics in Lake Placid, New York). That year he was named as German Sportsman of the Year. Hackl won the silver medal again in the 2002 Games, becoming the first Winter Olympian to win a medal in five consecutive Winter Olympics. Most recently, he placed 7th in the 2006 Winter Olympics.

Hackl has retired from active participation and got involved in coaching after the 2006 Winter Olympics. He is responsible for a group of German lugers nicknamed the "Sunshine Training Group", alongside Patric Leitner, with Hackl having responsibility for their sleds. Members of the group include Felix Loch, Natalie Geisenberger, Tobias Wendl and Tobias Arlt, who between them took a clean sweep of the gold medals in luge at the 2014 Winter Olympics.

Hackl won a total of 22 medals at the FIL World Luge Championships, including ten golds (Men's singles: 1989, 1990, 1997; Mixed team: 1991, 1993, 1995, 2000, 2001, 2003, 2005), ten silvers (Men's singles: 1991, 1993, 1995, 1996, 2001, 2004, 2005; Men's doubles: 1987, Mixed team: 1996, 1997), and two bronzes (Men's singles: 2000, Mixed team: 1999).

At the FIL European Luge Championships, Hackl won twelve medals. This included seven golds (Men's singles: 1988, 1990; Mixed team: 1988, 1992, 1996, 2000, 2002), four silvers (Men's singles: 1994, 2000; Mixed team: 1990, 1994), and one bronze (Men's singles: 1992).

He won the overall Luge World Cup title in men's singles twice (1988–9, 1989–90) and also had his best overall finish of second in men's doubles twice (1986–7, 1987–8).

Hackl is also a nine-time wok racing world champion.

He was inducted into the International Luge Federation's Hall of Fame in 2013.

In 1999, Hackl married his long-term girlfriend, Margit (née Datzmann).

See also
List of multiple Olympic gold medalists in one event

References

 
IOC profile

External links 
 
 
 

 
 

1966 births
Living people
German male lugers
German sports coaches
Olympic lugers of Germany
Olympic gold medalists for Germany
Olympic silver medalists for Germany
Olympic silver medalists for West Germany
Olympic medalists in luge
Lugers at the 1988 Winter Olympics
Lugers at the 1992 Winter Olympics
Lugers at the 1994 Winter Olympics
Lugers at the 1998 Winter Olympics
Lugers at the 2002 Winter Olympics
Lugers at the 2006 Winter Olympics
Medalists at the 1988 Winter Olympics
Medalists at the 1992 Winter Olympics
Medalists at the 1994 Winter Olympics
Medalists at the 1998 Winter Olympics
Medalists at the 2002 Winter Olympics
People from Berchtesgaden
Sportspeople from Upper Bavaria
20th-century German people
21st-century German people